Finnish Championship League (Rugbyn SM-sarja) is the premier rugby union competition in Finland, formed in 2002. The league is governed by the Finnish Rugby Federation, the governing body for Rugby union in Finland. The league is played in summer months. Ten teams took part in the competition since 2014 season until 2016 season but from 2017 season onwards the competition has been held between six teams. The reigning champion (2022) is Helsinki RC.

Clubs in 2022
Eagles RFC, Turku
Helsinki RC, Helsinki
Jyväskylä RC, Jyväskylä
Kuopio RC, Kuopio
Porvoo RC, Porvoo
Warriors RC, Helsinki

Champions
2002 – Helsinki RUFC
2003 – Helsinki RUFC (2)
2004 – Jyväskylä RC
2005 – Jyväskylä RC (2)
2006 – Tampere RC
2007 – Tampere RC (2)
2008 – Warriors RC
2009 – Warriors RC (2)
2010 – Warriors RC (3)
2011 – Warriors RC (4)
2012 – Warriors RC (5)
2013 – Tampere RC (3)
2014 – Helsinki RUFC (3)
2015 – Warriors RC (6)
2016 – Helsinki RUFC (4)
2017 – Jyväskylä RC (3)
2018 – Warriors RC (7)
2019 – Warriors RC (8)
2020 – Helsinki RUFC (5)
2021 – Helsinki RUFC (6)
2022 – Helsinki RUFC (7)

See also
 Rugby union in Finland

External links
 Finnish Rugby Federation

 
Rugby union competitions in Finland
National rugby union premier leagues
Fin
2002 establishments in Finland
Sports leagues established in 2002
Professional sports leagues in Finland